Nemosia is a genus of South American birds in the tanager family Thraupidae.

The genus was introduced by the French ornithologist Louis Jean Pierre Vieillot in 1816 with the hooded tanager as the type species. The name Nemosia is from the Ancient Greek nemos meaning "glade" or "dell".

Species
The genus contains two species:

References

 
Bird genera